Eugene McCaghwell, was a bishop in Ireland in the early 16th century: he was Dean of Clogher until 1505, and bishop from then until his death in 1515. His brother William McCaghwell succeeded him as dean.

References

16th-century Roman Catholic bishops in Ireland
Deans of Clogher
1508 deaths
Pre-Reformation bishops of Clogher